Beaufort railway station may refer to: